is a 2015 Japanese animated action fantasy film based on the Pretty Cure franchise created by Izumi Todo. The film is directed by Junji Shimizu, written by Mio Inoue, and produced by Toei Animation. The film was released in Japan on March 14, 2015.

Marking the seventh entry to the Pretty Cure All Stars crossover film series, the Go! Princess PreCure team joins the previous Pretty Cure teams to a Spring Carnival in a musical kingdom of Harmonia.

Plot
While waiting to go shopping, Minami compliments Haruka's singing, but Kirara freaks her out as she mentions a singing exam. Then, the Pretty Cures receive an invitation to a Spring Carnival taking place in the musical kingdom of Harmonia. At the same time, two devious criminals Odoren and Utaen captured the kingdom. As they arrive, Go! Princess PreCure team introduce themselves to the HappinessCharge PreCure! team: Megumi, Hime, Yūko and Iona, whom are surprised by the new Cures. Posing as the royals, Odoren asks the Pretty Cures to perform on stage to show their appreciation for the fairies, which puts more pressure on Haruka.

As each of the Pretty Cures perform, Odoren and his partner Utaen secretly capture their fairies and steal their transformation items. Near the end of the carnival, Odoren, having obtained everyone's items, seals them away in a chest so they can no longer transform. However, Haruka, believing in the power of song, sings alongside Minami and Kirara, awakening Dress Up Keys that frees the locked away items. 

Working together, the Cures fight off Odoren's minions and free the captured royal family, who reveal the festival was meant to appease a dragon who guards over Harmonia. Enraged by the festival being interrupted, the kingdom's deity dragon awakens and unleashes its anger upon the kingdom. However, by using the keys formed from their song, the Go! Princess team, with the power of all the Cures to transform into the "Primevera Elegant Mode", and uses the "Pretty Cure Rainbow Tornado" to calm down the dragon. With royal family's gratitude and the deity's request, the Go! Princess team takes the stage, while Odoren and Utaen ends up as the kingdom's janitors.

Haruka, Minami and Kirara heads back to school, though Haruka is more determined to sing and ace the exam.

Voice cast
Go! Princess PreCure cast
Yū Shimamura as Haruka Haruno/Cure Flora
Masumi Asano as Minami Kaido/Cure Mermaid
Hibiku Yamamura as Kirara Amanogawa/Cure Twinkle
Nao Tōyama as Pafu
Shiho Kokido as Aroma

HappinessCharge PreCure! cast
Megumi Nakajima as Megumi Aino/Cure Lovely
Megumi Han as Hime Shirayuki/Cure Princess
Rina Kitagawa as Yūko Omori/Cure Honey
Haruka Tomatsu as Iona Hikawa/Cure Fortune
Naoko Matsui as Ribbon
Miyuki Koburi as Glassun

DokiDoki! PreCure cast
Hitomi Nabatame as Mana Aida/Cure Heart
Minako Kotobuki as Rikka Hishikawa/Cure Diamond

Smile PreCure! cast
Misato Fukuen as Miyuki Hoshizora/Cure Happy
Asami Tano as Akane Hino/Cure Sunny

Suite PreCure cast
Ami Koshimizu as Hibiki Hojo/Cure Melody

HeartCatch PreCure! cast
Nana Mizuki as Tsubomi Hanasaki/Cure Blossom
Fumie Mizusawa as Erika Kurumi/Cure Marine

Fresh Pretty Cure! cast
Kanae Oki as Love Momozono/Cure Peach

Yes! PreCure 5 GoGo! cast
Yūko Sanpei as Nozomi Yumehara/Cure Dream

Futari wa Pretty Cure Splash Star cast
Orie Kimoto as Saki Hyuga/Cure Bloom/Cure Bright

Futari wa Pretty Cure Max Heart cast
Yōko Honna as Nagisa Misumi/Cure Black
Yukana as Honoka Yukishiro/Cure White
Tomokazu Seki as Mepple

Film characters
Atsuhiko Nakata as Odoren
Shingo Fujimori as Utaen

Three members of Morning Musume: Haruna Iikubo, Ayumi Ishida, and Sakura Oda voiced few fairies based on them.

Production
On November 2014, it was announced that the next Pretty Cure All Stars film was in the works, with Junji Shimizu directing the film, with Mio Inoue providing the screenplay, and Yasuharu Takanashi providing the musical score. 

The film features two version of the theme song, titled . The first version, sung by the voice actresses of Pretty Cure All Stars is used as an insert song for the film, while Japanese girl group Morning Musume sung the second version, which was used for the ending.

Release
The film was released in theaters in Japan on March 14, 2015.

References

External links

2015 films
Pretty Cure films
Toei Animation films
2015 anime films
Crossover anime and manga
Japanese magical girl films
Films scored by Yasuharu Takanashi